Language and history in the early Germanic world is a book by Dennis Howard Green, the Schröder Professor of German at the University of Cambridge. It was published in hardback by Cambridge University Press in 1998. The book uses linguistic evidence for the study of early Germanic culture and history. A paperback edition was published by Cambridge University Press in 2000. An Italian translation was published in 2015.

See also 

 Altgermanische Religionsgeschichte
 Early Germanic Literature and Culture
 Germanische Altertumskunde Online
 The Early Germans

Sources

External links
 UK Publisher's website 

1998 non-fiction books
Cambridge University Press books
Germanic studies